Body Meta is an album by Ornette Coleman and Prime Time.

Reception
In a review for AllMusic, Michael G. Nastos wrote that the musicians on Body Meta are "loud, boisterous, imaginative, unfettered by conventional devices, and wail beyond compare with Coleman within relatively funky, straight beats." Regarding the album, he stated: "As every track is different, Coleman's vision has a diffuse focus, but it's clear that things have changed. Even his personal sound is more pronounced, unleashed from shackles, and more difficult to pin down." Robert Christgau awarded the album an "A minus", and wrote: "Hidden in Coleman's dense electric music are angles deep enough to dive into and sharp enough to cut your throat. This isn't quite as dense or consistent as Dancing in Your Head -- 'Fou Amour' does wander. But 'Voice Poetry' is as funky as James Chance if not James Brown. And 'Home Grown' is as funky as Robert Johnson."

Writing for Fact Magazine, Frank Schindelbeck stated: "While many regard Dancing [In Your Head] to be the key Prime Time document, in my opinion it's Body Meta that first showed the full depth of Ornette's new band. The inaugural release on Coleman's own Artists House label, Body Meta touches on juke joint blues vamps, cubist refractions of James Brown's 'on the one' style, and even militaristic waltzes. It is perhaps the most loose-limbed and deceptively relaxed of any release featuring the Prime Time band, who were known for their taut intensity. The album is also hugely important in that by setting up the Artists House label, Coleman showed that an artist of his stature and reputation could operate outside of the confines of major label hierarchy, ushering in a new era of independent and underground jazz distribution."

Track listing
All tracks composed by Ornette Coleman

Side A 
 "Voice Poetry" – 8:00
 "Home Grown" – 7:36

Side B 
 "Macho Woman" – 7:35
 "Fou Amor" – 8:01
 "European Echoes" – 7:40

Personnel
Ornette Coleman - Saxophone, Alto Saxophone
Charlie Ellerbie - Guitar
Ronald Shannon Jackson - Drums
Bern Nix - Guitar
Jamaaladeen Tacuma - Bass
Elisabeth Atnafu - Artwork

References

1978 albums
Ornette Coleman albums
Artists House albums